"So What" is a song recorded by American singer Pink for her fifth studio album, Funhouse (2008). The song was written by Pink, Max Martin, and Shellback, and produced by Martin. Selected as the album's lead single, "So What" was first released on August 11, 2008, and to mainstream radios on August 25, 2008, through LaFace and Zomba Label Group. The song consists of a martial beat and synth backing. The lyrics are based on her separation from motocross racer Carey Hart, which occurred six months prior to the release.

"So What" received positive reviews from contemporary music critics; many praised it for its aggressive and empowering nature while others deemed it childish and bratty. The song was also successful commercially, topping the charts in several countries across Europe and Oceania and peaking within the top five worldwide. In the United States, the song reached number one on the Billboard Hot 100, becoming her second single to top the chart. "So What" also became her highest-selling single in the United States, with sales of over four million downloads.

The music video for "So What" was directed by longtime collaborator Dave Meyers. It shows Pink drinking while riding a lawnmower, sawing down a tree, streaking on a red carpet appearance and other activities. The video also features a cameo appearance from Hart. Pink performed "So What" on MTV Europe Music Awards 2008 on November 6, 2008. The song was nominated for several awards, eventually winning the MTV Europe Music Award for the Most Addictive Track.

Background and production
"So What" was written by Pink, Shellback, and Max Martin, drawing influences from the experience. Martin also handled the production and recording, which took place at Maratone Studios in Stockholm, Sweden. Al Clay also recorded the song at the House of Blues Studio – a recording studio in Los Angeles, California. The song was mixed at MixStar Studios in Virginia Beach, Virginia by Serban Ghenea. John Hanes edited the song using Pro Tools technology with assistance provided by Tim Roberts. The song was finally mastered by Tom Coyne at Sterling Sound in New York City, New York. The song's lyrical content was based on her separation from her husband, motocross rider Carey Hart. After reuniting with Hart on January 1, 2009, Pink told Ellen DeGeneres in an interview on DeGeneres' syndicated talk show that she found it "funny" to perform the song when he was in the audience and especially enjoyed the bit where she sang the line "You're a tool".

Composition

"So What" carries an energetic vibe. The song consists of a powerful charging beat, a singalong chorus, and a synthesizer backing influenced by club music. The song's verses and pre-choruses are written in the key of F-sharp minor, and its choruses and bridge are written in the key of A major. The initial riff is closely familiar to Deep Purple's "Black Night". Lyrically, the song chronicles the protagonist's adventures following her separation from her husband. Evan Sawdey of PopMatters noted that the song has a hint of desperation in the lines "I don’t want you tonight, I’m alright, I'm just fine", implying that she is spending time convincing herself that she's enjoying the single life.

Release
"So What" was released as the first single from Pink's fifth studio album Funhouse (2008). It was first released on August 11, 2008, via digital download to certain countries including Australia, Canada, New Zealand, and the United Kingdom. LaFace and Jive Records solicited the song to contemporary hit radio on August 25, 2008. On September 20, 2008, "So What" was released as a two-track single to digital retailers in certain countries. The single included a B-side, "Could've Had Everything". An extended play was released across Europe on September 26, 2008, containing "Could've had Everything" and the original and instrumental version of "So What". On October 24 and November 14, 2008, remixes by UK dance music group Bimbo Jones was released to digital retailers across Europe in the form of a radio mix and the regular mix. In the United States, "So What" was released as a CD single, featuring the clean and unedited versions of the song.

Critical reception
Reed Fischer of Village Voice noted it was the "newest entry in the Fantastic Empowerment Anthems genre." Stephen Thomas Erlewine, senior editor of Allmusic, named it one of Funhouse'''s best tracks, calling it, in conjunction with "Bad Influence", "instantly indelible". Andy Battaglia of The A.V. Club expressed a different opinion towards the song, calling it "so blaring and bad as to make Funhouse seem like a lost cause from the start." Chris Willman of Entertainment Weekly praised "So What" as a great anthem of "bluffing and bravado", while Jon Caramanica of The New York Times referred to the song as "perfunctory". Evan Sawdey of PopMatters wrote positively about the song, calling it "as big a red herring single as you can find." Jonathan Keefe of Slant Magazine called "So What" a middling effort among the songs he considers viable single material in Funhouse. Keefe later referred to it as nothing more than a "schoolyard taunt", linking it to Pink's 2001 single "Get the Party Started" (Missundaztood, 2001).

Bill Lamb of About.com awarded "So What" a four-and-a-half–star rating, praising the song's synth backing and beat and Pink's attitude. Lamb also praised Max Martin for his production work on the song, writing that he "punches up the energy level to 10." Nick Levine of Digital Spy, in his review of the leaked single, called the song "brash, childish, slightly ridiculous, packed with attitude and sounds like something only Pink could get away with." Levine also called it "terrifically catchy" and praised the chorus as one "that practically begs you to chant along." Following its official release in the United Kingdom, Levine awarded it a five-star rating, calling it one that people will sing along to. Lucy Davies of BBC called the song an "aggressively swinging opener" that "slams Pink's cards down on the table setting the defiant, self-deprecating tone of the album." Michael Cragg of musicOMH wrote that Pink was at her best when she uses her life experiences to create "smart, energetic pop songs", citing "So What" as one of them.

Accolades
This song was number 29 on Rolling Stones list of the 100 Best Songs of 2008. Time critic Josh Tyrangiel named this the #2 song of 2008.

Chart performance
"So What" became Pink's most successful single from Funhouse (2008). In the United States, the song entered at number nine on the Billboard Hot 100 in the issue dated September 6, 2008, earning the highest debut title for that week. Two weeks later, the song topped the US Hot Digital Songs chart, selling 197,000 digital downloads. One week later, in the issue September 27, 2008, it topped the Billboard Hot 100, selling 253,000 downloads that week. The song became her second number-one hit on the chart after her 2001 collaboration single "Lady Marmalade" with Christina Aguilera, Lil' Kim, and Mýa. The song also topped the US Adult Pop Songs in the issue dated December 20, 2008, and on the US Pop Songs chart for four weeks.Sources for "So What" positions on the US Pop Songs Chart (Billboard):
 Week of October 25, 2008: 
 Week of November 1, 2008: 
 Week of November 8, 2008: 
 Week of November 15, 2008: 
 Week of November 22, 2008:  It also peaked at number 21 on the US Hot Dance Club Songs. "So What" has sold 4,624,000 digital downloads in the United States as of August 2013.

"So What" proved to be a major success across Europe as it peaked inside the top five in various countries. In the United Kingdom, the song entered the singles chart at number 38 in the issue dated October 4, 2008. It ascended to number one in the following week, becoming Pink's third UK number one and staying there for three consecutive weeks before being knocked off the top spot by Girls Aloud’s  The Promise. The song lasted a total of 36 weeks on the chart, selling 500,000 copies in the United Kingdom, according to The Official Charts Company. "So What" debuted at number nine on the Swedish Singles Chart on September 4, 2008. A week later, on September 11, 2008, it rose to its peak position at number two, where it remained for two weeks. The song was certified gold by the Swedish Recording Industry Association (GLF) on December 11, 2008, for shipments of 20,000 units. Upon its debut in Switzerland, the song topped the singles chart and remained there for three more weeks. The song ran on the chart for a course of 41 weeks, during which it sold 30,000 units, earning a platinum certification by International Federation of the Phonographic Industry – Switzerland.

"So What" topped the singles charts in both Australia and New Zealand. In Australia, it remained atop the chart for four consecutive weeks and on the chart for nearly eight months. The song shipped 280,000 units in Australia, earning a quadruple platinum certification by the Australian Recording Industry Association (ARIA). In New Zealand, the single debuted on the singles chart at number 25 on August 18, 2008. Three weeks later, it topped the chart, where it stayed for five consecutive weeks. It lasted a total of 24 weeks on the chart, selling 15,000 copies and earning a platinum certification from the Recording Industry Association of New Zealand (RIANZ) on January 11, 2009.

Music video
Dave Meyers, who is known for having artists giving an over-the-top portrayal of celebrities or themselves, directed the video for "So What". Pink previously worked with him for the videos to "U + Ur Hand" and "Stupid Girls", which earned MTV Video Music Award for Best Pop Video. Pink also worked with Meyers on the videos for "There You Go", "Most Girls", "You Make Me Sick", "Get the Party Started", "Don't Let Me Get Me" and the Charlie's Angels: Full Throttle track "Feel Good Time". The video was shown on August 22 on FNMTV. The video premiered on August 22 on the UK music site Popjustice. Pink posted a message on her website for her fans about what it was like to shoot the video: 
 The video begins in a tattoo parlor, Pink is getting a tattoo of a red void mark on her arm across an existing tattoo before the scene cuts to Pink riding down Sunset Boulevard on a lawnmower and drinking alcohol. Pink is then shown entering Guitar Center and browsing guitars. She pretends to play before attempting to smash it into the ground, but she is restrained by a store clerk which leads to them engaging in a fight. Pink is shown cutting down a tree engraved with her real name and her estranged husband's name with a chainsaw. She cries on the chainsaw while telling herself that she is all right, right before the tree falls and nearly crushes her neighbor. After this, Pink is sitting in a bar after losing her table to Jessica Simpson, accompanied by a man who is playing the drums out of glasses.

The next scene goes to Pink on a motorbike, while a newly wedded couple in a car pull up beside her and wave and smile at her. Jealous and outraged at the happy newlyweds, Pink is shown throwing objects at the car and popping the blown-up condoms used to decorate the vehicle, before climbing onto it and playfully (albeit violently) attacking the vehicle. Pink is then shown stripping on the red carpet, surrounded by photographers, she takes off her jacket to reveal her (blurred) nude body. The paparazzi all snap photos of her as she does choreography from Michael Jackson's video for "Thriller" naked, but more akin to Austin Powers 2. Then, while getting her hair done, her stylist applies hairspray as Pink turns on her cigarette lighter, accidentally setting her hair on fire. Also shown are two men urinating in beer bottles, which they give to Pink, however, Pink passes them to two men walking past her. They drink it and then realizing what it is, spit it out in disgust. Finally, Pink is shown surrounded by men and women in their underwear engaging in a pillow fight.

The video then cuts between all the scenes shown in the video before ending with Pink poking her tongue at the camera with her husband. Pink is also shown performing the song in concert near the end. Pink's husband, Carey Hart, makes cameos throughout the video, such as a scene where they are talking as newspaper headlines flash behind them. Producer Butch Walker also makes a cameo. Pink has stated that Hart had not heard the song prior to arriving for the video shoot. The video was released on September 6 on iTunes. The video was ranked on VH1 as the 3rd best music video of 2008 on the Top 40 Videos of 2008. On Facebook, it was the second favorite video of 2008. The scene from the video where Pink's hair is set on fire is censored on MTV UK and its sister channels. That scene is replaced with other short clips from the video.

Credits and personnel
Recording, mixing and mastering
 Recorded at Maratone Studios in Stockholm, Sweden and House of Blues Studio in Los Angeles, California
 Mixed at MixStar Studios in Virginia Beach, Virginia
 Mastered at Sterling Sound in New York City, New York

Personnel
 Vocals – Pink
 Songwriting – Pink, Max Martin, Shellback
 Production – Max Martin
 Recording – Max Martin, Al Clay
 Mixing – Serban Ghenea
 Pro Tools editing – John Hanes, assisted by Tim Roberts
 Mastering – Tom Coyne
Credits adapted from Funhouse'' liner notes, LaFace Records, Jive Records.

Track listing

Digital single
"So What" – 3:34

Two-track single
"So What" – 3:34
"Could've Had Everything" – 3:09
"So What" (Video) – 3:46

EP
"So What" – 3:34
"So What (Clean)" – 3:35
"Could've Had Everything" – 3:09

Bimbo Jones Radio Mix
"So What (Bimbo Jones Radio Mix)" – 3:36

CD single

Digital single
"So What" – 3:34

Two-track single
"So What" – 3:34
"Could've Had Everything" – 3:09
"So What" (Video) – 3:46

EP
"So What" – 3:34
"So What (Clean)" – 3:35
"Could've Had Everything" – 3:09

Bimbo Jones Radio Mix
"So What (Bimbo Jones Radio Mix)" – 3:36

CD single
"So What (Clean)" – 3:35
"So What" – 3:35

Bimbo Jones Mix
"So What (Bimbo Jones Mix)" – 7:29

CD single (UK and Ireland only)

"So What" – 3:35
"Could've Had Everything" – 3:09

Charts

Weekly charts

Year-end charts

Decade-end charts

Certifications

|type=single|relyear=2008|certyear=2022|access-date=February 18, 2022|refname="bpi"}}

Radio and release history

See also
List of number-one singles in Australia in 2008
List of number-one hits of 2008 (Austria)
List of Hot 100 number-one singles of 2008 (Canada)
List of European number-one hits of 2008
List of number-one hits of 2008 (Germany)
List of number-one singles of 2008 (Ireland)
List of number-one hits of 2008 (Switzerland)
List of number-one singles from the 2000s (New Zealand)
List of number-one singles from the 2000s (UK)
List of Hot 100 number-one singles of 2008 (U.S.)
List of number-one dance airplay hits of 2008 (U.S.)

References

2008 singles
Pink (singer) songs
Billboard Hot 100 number-one singles
Number-one singles in Australia
Number-one singles in Austria
Canadian Hot 100 number-one singles
European Hot 100 Singles number-one singles
Number-one singles in Germany
Irish Singles Chart number-one singles
Number-one singles in Israel
Number-one singles in New Zealand
Number-one singles in Switzerland
UK Singles Chart number-one singles
Music videos directed by Dave Meyers (director)
Song recordings produced by Max Martin
Songs written by Max Martin
Songs written by Pink (singer)
Songs written by Shellback (record producer)
Songs with feminist themes
LaFace Records singles
2008 songs
Number-one singles in Scotland